Dane Whitman is an American politician and a member of the Democratic Party who has served in the Vermont House of Representatives since 2021.

Whitman serves on the House Committee on Human Services, Canvassing, and Opioid Settlement.

References

21st-century American politicians
Living people
Democratic Party members of the Vermont House of Representatives
Year of birth missing (living people)